Association Sportive Quatre Bornes is a Mauritian football club based in Quatre Bornes, Plaines Wilhems District. In 2017–18, they play in Mauritian League.

Ground
Their home stadium is Stade Sir Guy Rozemont in Quatre Bornes.

See also
 Mauritius Football Association
 List of football clubs in Mauritius

References

Football clubs in Mauritius
Quatre Bornes